Tanden refers to:
 Dantian, the "energy center" in traditional Chinese medicine and in meditative and exercise techniques such as qigong, martial arts and t'ai chi ch'uan
 Tandon, Indian surname
 Neera Tanden (born 1970), American political consultant and former government official